Dark EBM Souls was an annual small international industrial festival held in Bratislava, Slovakia, in February 2015 with successors in 2016, 2017, 2018 and 2019.

Dark EBM Souls is mainly focused on the genres Electro Industrial and Dark Ambient.

Edition v1 2015
The v1 edition was hosted in Bratislava as a one-day event 28.02.15 with the lineup:
ISH,
Terminal State,
Jihad,
Kifoth,
MC1R and
Fïx8:Sëd8.

Edition v2 2016
The v2 edition was a 2-day event in Bratislava 26.02.16 - 27.02.16 with the lineup:
Vomito Negro,
Fïx8:Sëd8,
The Opposer Divine,
tri-state,
kFactor,
kleqq,
ISH,
Fjordwalker,
Kifoth and
Jihad .

Edition v3 2017
The v3 edition was a one day event in Bratislava 11.02.17 with the lineup:
Frontier Guards,
2nd Face,
Amnistia,
Gaping Chasm,
Haujobb and Samhain
.

Edition v4 2018
The fourth edition of Dark EBM souls was a one night event 10 March 2018 in Bratislava with the lineup: 
Dive, 
Placebo Effect,
Fïx8:Sëd8, Last Influence of Brain, Proleturan and Full contact 69.

Edition v5 2019
The v5 edition was a one night event 23.3.19. with the lineup:
Architect,
Amorphous,
Cardinal Noire, 
Ecplipsed, 
Static Charge Disease.

Recordings
The artist Jihad released a live album from the concert of the first festival edition of 2015.

See also

List of industrial music festivals
List of electronic music festivals

References

External links
Official Website

Industrial music festivals
Electronic music festivals in Slovakia
Music festivals established in 2015